Félix Juan Trinidad García (born January 10, 1973), popularly known as "Tito" Trinidad, is a Puerto Rican former professional boxer who competed from 1990 to 2008. He held multiple world championships in three weight classes and is considered to be one of the greatest Puerto Rican boxers of all time.

After winning five national amateur championships in Puerto Rico, Trinidad debuted as a professional when he was seventeen, and won his first world championship by defeating Maurice Blocker to win the IBF welterweight title in 1993, a title he would hold for almost seven years with fifteen defenses. As his career continued, he defeated Oscar De La Hoya to win the WBC and lineal welterweight titles in 1999; Fernando Vargas to win the unified WBA and IBF light middleweight titles in 2000; and William Joppy for the WBA middleweight title in 2001.

Trinidad's first professional loss was against Bernard Hopkins later in 2001, and following this, he retired from boxing for the first time. Trinidad made his ring return by defeating Ricardo Mayorga in 2004. After a losing effort against Winky Wright in 2005, he retired for a second time. In 2008 he returned once more and lost to Roy Jones Jr. Subsequently, Trinidad entered a hiatus without clarifying the status of his career.

Trinidad is frequently mentioned among the best Puerto Rican boxers of all time by sports journalists and analysts, along with Juan Laporte, Esteban De Jesús, Wilfredo Vázquez, Miguel Cotto, Wilfred Benítez, Wilfredo Gómez, Héctor Camacho, Edwin Rosario and Carlos Ortíz. In 2000, Trinidad was voted Fighter of the Year by The Ring magazine and the Boxing Writers Association of America. He is ranked number 30 on The Rings list of 100 greatest punchers of all time and in 2002 named him the 51st greatest fighter of the past 80 years. In 2013, Trinidad became eligible and was voted into the 2014 Class of the International Boxing Hall of Fame. He was officially inducted into the hall during a ceremony held on June 4, 2014, becoming the tenth Puerto Rican to receive such an honor.

Amateur career
Trinidad was champion in the International Boxing Federation, in the World Boxing Association, and the World Boxing Council. He had an impressive record with 42 wins and 3 losses, with 35 by knockout. His career as an athlete in this discipline began at 12 years of age, as he has won five awards at the amateur championships in his home country (100, 112, 119, 126, and 132 pounds), his amateur sheet was a record of 51–6.

Professional career
Welterweight
Trinidad debuted as a professional on March 10, 1990, when he was 17 years old. The fight was against Angel Romero, another debuting boxer, in a contest that Trinidad won by knockout in the second round. At the beginning of his career, he knocked out nine of his first 10 opponents. He then competed against more experienced boxers like Jake Rodriguez, whom he fought on December 6, 1991. Trinidad won the fight by unanimous decision but suffered an injury on his right hand. He was then inactive for five months while recovering from the injury.

Raul Gonzalez fought Felix Trinidad on May 3, 1992, in Cayey, Puerto Rico. This fight was the main event of the night. Both Gonzalez and Trinidad weighed in at 142 pounds. Gonzalez had a record of 8-2-3 with 5 KOs, while Trinidad had a record of 13–0 with 10 KOs. Gonzalez went down three times, and Trinidad took the victory in round four by TKO. Trinidad would add another victory by KO to his record and would now make it 14–0 with 11 KOs.

Welterweight title
Trinidad traveled to San Diego, California, and defeated the IBF welterweight champion Maurice Blocker in two rounds, in a fight card on June 19, 1993, televised by Showtime. Trinidad spent the first two minutes of the fight analyzing Blocker's style. With 11 seconds left in the first round, one of Trinidad's punches injured Blocker, who barely survived the round. In the second round, the champion's condition improved, but after the first 30 seconds, another Trinidad punch injured him. Trinidad followed with a combination, scoring a knockout at 1:49 in the round when the referee stopped the fight. Afterward, tournament organizer Don King's exclusive relationship to stage fights for the cable channel Showtime meant that Trinidad would be showcased regularly on Showtime Championship Boxing.

Trinidad vs. Camacho
Trinidad defended his title for the next three years against several opponents. Trinidad's first fight in Las Vegas was against Héctor Camacho on January 29, 1994. He was cautious during the first rounds and received a cut over his left eye. In the third round he connected a solid combination that made Camacho change to a defensive stance. Throughout the fight Trinidad was on the offensive and won the fight by unanimous decision, in what was his first decision since he won the world championship. The scores awarded by the judges were 117–109, 116–110, and 119–106.

Trinidad vs. Campas
On September 17, 1994, Trinidad traveled to the MGM Grand for a second straight fight to compete in a title defense against Yori Boy Campas, who had a record of 56–0. In the second round Campas scored a knockdown, the second knockdown in Trinidad's career. Following this Trinidad exchanged several combinations, injuring Campas' face and breaking his nose. In the fourth round, the referee stopped the fight, the first defeat in Campas' career.

Trinidad vs. Carr
Trinidad's fourth fight outside Puerto Rico or the United States took place on Estadio de Beisbol in Monterrey, Mexico. Trinidad was scheduled to defend his title against the undefeated Oba Carr. In the second round, Carr scored a knockdown, which was the product of a quick right hand punch. Trinidad continued the fight and pursued the challenger, who displayed a quick pace throughout the fight. In the fourth round Trinidad connected a solid punch that injured Carr, and in the eighth he scored three consecutive knockdowns before the referee stopped the fight by technical knockout.

Trinidad spent the next four years defending his title against numerous fighters in bouts televised on Showtime. Among these fights was a defense against Mahenge Zulu, the number two challenger for Trinidad's championship.  This fight was part of a card that took place on April 3, 1998, in Bayamón, Puerto Rico and marked the first time that Trinidad had performed in the island in five years. Trinidad began the first round by cautiously analyzing the challenger's style, but the round ended with quick exchanges after Zulu took the initiative in the offensive. In the second round Zulu was actively pursuing the champion, but retreated when he received a solid jab sequence. Early in the third round a series of jabs opened a wound on Zulu's mouth, while the challenger's punches were not reaching their target. Trinidad began the fourth round heavily on in the offensive connecting several combinations which hurt the challenger, using this to land more punches in Zulu's head and body. One punch hit Zulu in the jaw, he fell to the floor and tried to rise, but the referee stopped the fight before he could do so.

Trinidad vs. Whitaker
On February 20, 1999, Trinidad defended the welterweight championship against Pernell Whitaker, winning the fight by unanimous decision in a contest that marked his thirteenth successful defense. The fight began with both boxers displaying aggressive styles, which included excessive pushing. In the following rounds both boxers used their jabs most of the time with Trinidad gaining an advantage when Whitaker attempted to attack inside, eventually scoring a knockdown in round two. In the fourth, fifth and sixth rounds the fighters exchanged combinations.  Later in the fight both boxers fell to the floor in what were ruled as "accidental slips." On the seventh round Whitaker displayed more offense, trading power punches with Trinidad, but the champion retained control in the fight's tempo during the eight, ninth, and tenth rounds. In the last round Whitaker, with a badly swollen right eye, displayed a purely defensive stance, avoiding his opponent throughout the round while Trinidad continued on the offensive until the fight concluded. The judges gave the champion scores of 117–111, 118–109 and 118–109.

Trinidad vs. De La Hoya

In the spring of 1999 Don King and Oscar De la Hoya's promoter, Bob Arum, agreed to co-promote a mega-fight for the Lineal, WBC and IBF welterweight championships on September 18, 1999, at the Mandalay Bay Hotel in Las Vegas. Early in the fight De la Hoya employed boxing to connect combinations while avoiding Trinidad's attacks. The second round began with both boxers trading punches but De la Hoya quickly returned to his previous tactic, which he employed in the third round. In the fourth round Trinidad pressured the offense while De la Hoya tried to avoid his punches by moving, both boxers eventually exchanged punches. In the fifth round Trinidad continued in the offensive while De la Hoya attempted to remain on the outside corners of the ring, Trinidad's eye was swollen following a trade of punches, and his nose was also bleeding. Trinidad was having a lot of problems finding De La Hoya and couldn't connect as flush as usual with his punches, although he scored at times, Oscar's movement was not letting him land in combination and it was proclaimed by many to have been a lackluster fight. In the eighth round the swelling on Trinidad's eye was worsening. Oscar was scoring on Trinidad but halfway through the tenth, De La Hoya stopped sticking and basically disengaged. De La Hoya gassed out and had remained on his toes for the remainder of the bout, and Trinidad won the final 2 rounds. The judges controversially gave Trinidad a close, majority decision, with scores of 115–113, 115–114 and 114–114.

Light Middleweight
Light Middleweight title
In 2000 Trinidad vacated the welterweight championships and moved to the junior middleweight division, in order to challenge the World Boxing Association's champion David Reid. Early in the fight Trinidad concentrated his punches on Reid's body, connecting hard punches to his ribs and belly. In the second round Reid connected a solid punch to his opponent's jaw, and in the third round scored a knockdown. In the fourth and fifth rounds Trinidad used his jab consistently, gaining control of the fight's tempo in the sixth round. The fight's score was close at the beginning of the seventh round but Trinidad opened the second half of the contest in the offensive, scoring the fight's second knockdown. Controlling the fight in the eighth, ninth and tenth rounds, and opening a cut over Reid's eye. Trinidad dominated the eleventh round, scoring three consecutive knockdowns. Reid tried to close the fight on the offensive but his opponent boxed and countered his attacks. The judges gave scores of 114–107, 114–106 and 115–106, all in favor of Trinidad.

Trinidad vs. Vargas
On December 2, 2000, he was scheduled to fight in a unification card against Fernando Vargas, the International Boxing Federation's junior middleweight champion. The fight began in a fast pace with Trinidad connecting a solid left hook that led to his opponent being knocked down. Vargas was able to stand up, but another classic left hook led to another knockdown. Early in the second round Trinidad was in the offensive but Vargas connected a solid combination at the round's closing moments which caused a slight swelling under Trinidad's right eye. In the fourth round's opening seconds a Vargas' short left hook connected on Trinidad's jaw and he fell on his backside getting up immediately., marking the eighth knockdown in his career. In the fifth round Vargas was in control of the fight's offensive, connecting combinations to Trinidad's body. In the sixth round Trinidad regained control of the fight's tempo that lasted throughout the contest, connecting punches on Vargas' head and left jabs to the ribs. In the eighth, Vargas displayed signs of exhaustion which slowed his offensive while Trinidad then pursued the offense with combinations to the body. This pattern continued throughout the ninth, tenth and eleventh rounds. Opening the final round Vargas was on the offensive, connecting a solid left hook. Trinidad countered the attack with a left hook that made Vargas collapse; Vargas was able to stand up, but was subsequently knocked down for a second time. With Vargas injured, Trinidad continued connecting combinations, and he ended his combination by putting Vargas down for the 3rd time in the round with a right hand which resulted in the referee waving the fight off, making Trinidad the winner.
During the fight, Trinidad was penalized twice for low blows, although the second one was legal, being exactly on the beltline. Vargas himself was penalized the same amount of times.

Middleweight
Trinidad vs. Joppy
Following his fight with Vargas, Trinidad moved up in weight – this time to participate in Don King's middleweight unification tournament featuring IBF champion Bernard Hopkins, WBA champion William Joppy, and WBC champion Keith Holmes. Trinidad was matched with Joppy, whom he defeated by technical knockout in the fifth round of a contest that took place on May 12, 2001. Joppy opened the first round on the offensive, but late in the round Trinidad scored a knockdown with a combination of punches that came close to throwing Joppy underneath the ropes. Trinidad subsequently scored a knockdown in the fourth round, during this stage of the competition he was using combinations of left hooks and right punches to the head. In the fifth round Trinidad scored another knockdown, Joppy attempted to continue the fight, but while he was using the ropes to help him stand, the referee stopped the fight. When the contest was over, Trinidad explained his strategy by stating: "I knew he wanted to impose his will, his weight, and I wouldn't let him do it".

Trinidad vs. Hopkins

The middleweight unification fight between Hopkins and Trinidad was originally scheduled for September 15, 2001, at the Madison Square Garden. On the morning of September 11, terrorists attacked the World Trade Center. Following this incident, the fight was postponed indefinitely. After receiving assurances from Madison Square Garden officials and the City of New York, Don King rescheduled the fight for September 29. The pace of the fight in the early rounds was slow, with each boxer studying his opponent.  In the second round Hopkins connected some combinations while Trinidad pursued the offensive in the fourth round and both boxers traded sequences of punches. This pattern continued in the fifth round with Trinidad showing an aggressive style while Hopkins relied on jabs. In the sixth Trinidad continued an offensive stance and won the round after trading several combinations. Both fighters continued to exchange punches in the eighth and ninth round with Hopkins connecting three consecutive solid punches. In the twelfth round Hopkins' scored a knockdown, but before the contest could continue Trinidad's father entered the ring, which led to the referee stopping the fight by technical knockout.

Next fight
Trinidad was subsequently scheduled to fight against Hacine Cherifi in a contest that he won by technical knockout in the fourth round. The event was part of a card that took place on May 11, 2002, and was organized in San Juan, Puerto Rico. Early in the first round Trinidad's strategy consisted of using his jab while Cherifi did not try to directly engage in the offensive. In the last minute of the round a punch by Trinidad hit Cherifi's chin leaving him disoriented, he followed this with a combination and scored a knockdown. In the second round, Trinidad displayed more boxing and was on the offensive by using combinations to the head and ribs. In the third Cherifi landed more punches than in the previous two, but Trinidad relied on throwing left jabs. One of his punches hit Cherifi's liver, followed by a punch to the jaw, making Cherifi fall to the floor. In the fourth, a series of combinations injured Cherifi, who collapsed to the floor twice, forfeiting the fight on the second occasion. Following this contest Trinidad announced his retirement, at the moment leaving the sport with a record of 41 wins, one defeat, and 34 wins by knockout.

Comeback
Trinidad vs. Mayorga

Trinidad announced a comeback on March 2, 2004. On October 2, 2004, he fought against Ricardo Mayorga, in Madison Square Garden. Early in the first round Mayorga was on the offensive connecting several combinations, later in the round Trinidad connected some punches to his opponent's face. Mayorga reacted defiantly while lowering his defense, which Trinidad used to continue the offensive during the closing seconds. In the second round he continued connecting with combinations to Mayorga's face which caused him to bleed from his nose; the round concluded with both fighters exchanging punches. In the third round Mayorga attempted to counter with punches to the body but did not do significant damage to his opponent, however later in the round one of these punches made Trinidad lose his balance and touch the floor with one glove which the referee counted as a knockdown. In the fourth round both boxers traded hard combinations. In the fifth Trinidad displayed control of the offense's tempo injuring Mayorga and opening a cut under one of his eyes. This pattern continued in the sixth and seventh round, and the cut on Mayorga's face began to swell. In the eight round Trinidad scored several knockdowns, Mayorga continued after two knockdowns, but lost by technical knockout following a third knockdown.

Trinidad vs. Wright
On May 14, 2005, Trinidad competed against Winky Wright, in a fight where the winner would become the World Boxing Council's number one challenger in the Middleweight division. Wright won the fight by decision, receiving scores of 120–107 and 119–108 twice by the judges. Trinidad's fighting style appeared to be out of rhythm in the first round, while Wright presented a defensive stance and relied on jabs. During the first three rounds Wright was in the offensive scoring with jabs. On the fourth round Trinidad connected a solid combination. In the sixth, Wright continued the strategy used in the previous rounds while Trinidad employed a strategy where he tried to neutralize his opponent's punches by standing in front of him. In the later rounds Trinidad tried to take the contest's offensive but his adversary managed to block most of his punches while continuing his previous tactic. In the twelfth round Trinidad pursued Wright while trying to score a knockout, but his opponent boxed away from him until the round ended. Following this fight, Trinidad retired temporarily, after his father informed him that he would not continue in his corner.

Second comeback
Trinidad vs. Jones Jr.

Trinidad came out of his second retirement for a fight against former four-division champion Roy Jones Jr. on January 19, 2008. The card took place at Madison Square Garden in New York City. Trinidad began the fight on the offensive and won the first two rounds. The third and fourth rounds were won by Jones who relied on the velocity of his punches. This pattern continued in the fifth and sixth rounds. In the seventh round, Jones scored a knockdown following a right hand. Following this Jones continued to use his speed while Trinidad pursued the offensive, in the tenth round Jones scored a second knockdown after landing a combination. The judges declared the fight a unanimous decision in favor of Jones with scores of 117–109 and 116–110 twice.

Retirement
After this fight, Trinidad was inactive for almost two years, before announcing on October 14, 2009, that he was "between 95 and 98 percent sure (that he would) not do anything more within boxing". During this timeframe, he made sporadic public appearances, attending boxing cards and participating in public activities, including a ceremony where Juan Manuel López and Iván Calderón received rings for five successful defenses of their world championships. Beginning in July 2009, Trinidad became involved with the World Wrestling Council, participating as a guest referee at their anniversary show. Three months later, he was included in a storyline that also included Orlando Colón. In 2010, Trinidad expressed interest in purchasing the Changos de Naranjito.

On September 12, 2018, judge Anthony Cuevas Ramos signed a letter which declared that the Banco Popular de Puerto Rico must pay Trinidad $2,000,000 dollars within 24 hours, due to them owing him interest money from his personal accounts at the bank.

On February 13, 2023, the Trinidad's reached a confidential agreement to solve their problems with their debtors, including Banco Popular de Puerto Rico, without going to court. 

Controversy
According to an interview with Hopkins' trainer Bouie Fisher, prior to the fight members of Hopkins' team visited the Trinidad dressing room in what is considered a normal boxing custom, to watch the taping of Trinidad's hands. The Hopkins camp claimed that Trinidad's hands were wrapped incorrectly, and threatened to cancel the fight unless they were rewrapped correctly. Fisher also stated that the Chief Inspector of the NYSAC insisted that Trinidad's camp indeed needed to re-wrap his hands the right way, without tape touching directly on the skin.  According to the New York State Athletic commission.

Personal life

Félix Trinidad was born in Fajardo, Puerto Rico, to a Puerto Rican family. During his childhood the family moved to Cupey Alto, a subdivision of San Juan, Puerto Rico, where he grew up. His future wife, Sharon Santiago, lived in Cupey and first met Trinidad in the home of her neighborhood friend, a classmate of Trinidad's. Trinidad pursued a relationship with Santiago, including an attempt to impress her with his red Ford Mustang. He continued to press for her affection and, with the help of Santiago's neighbor, Trinidad was able to win her over. Early on, Santiago's mother thought that Trinidad was related to her daughter's friend, but she realized the true situation when she visited the friend's house and he acted nervous in her presence. Santiago's father objected to the relationship because Trinidad was an athlete; at the time many athletes had a negative public image. Santiago became rebellious, but Trinidad eventually won her family's trust. The couple was married four years after they began dating and have had four daughters. Trinidad has a fifth daughter, named Alondra Nicole, from another relationship.

Professional boxing record

Titles in boxing   Major world titles:• IBF welterweight champion (147 lbs)

• WBC welterweight champion (147 lbs)

• WBA super welterweight champion (154 lbs)

• IBF super welterweight champion (154 lbs)

• WBA middleweight champion (160 lbs)Lineal world titles:'

•Lineal welterweight champion (147 lbs)

Pay-per-view bouts

See also

List of Puerto Ricans
List of welterweight boxing champions
List of light middleweight boxing champions
List of middleweight boxing champions
List of boxing triple champions
List of Puerto Rican boxing world champions
List of boxing families
 Sports in Puerto Rico
African immigration to Puerto Rico

References

External links

Boxinginsider.com profile interview with Felix 'Tito' Trinidad

 

World Boxing Association champions
World Boxing Council champions
International Boxing Federation champions
International Boxing Hall of Fame inductees
1973 births
Living people
People from Fajardo, Puerto Rico
Puerto Rican male boxers
World welterweight boxing champions
World light-middleweight boxing champions
World middleweight boxing champions